Polish–Taiwanese relations refers to the bilateral relations between the Republic of Poland and the Republic of China (Taiwan).

Under the circumstance of the One China policy, Poland, like a majority of the nations in the world, does not have official diplomatic ties with the Republic of China on Taiwan, and only recognizes the People’s Republic of China as the sole representative of China, however they do not take a position or recognize Taiwan as part of that China. Nonetheless, relationship between two countries have expanded dramatically, and since Poland transformed into a market economy after 1990, Taiwan has been one of largest Asian investors to Poland.

Despite this, they have their representative offices in respective countries. Poland has a representative office in Taipei while Taiwan has a representative office in Warsaw.

History
Poland and China had established relations following the resurgence of Poland at 1919, but two countries didn't develop a strong relationship due to remoteness. After communist takeovers of both Poland and mainland China, there had been no official diplomatic mission between two states. Communist Poland only considered the newly established People's Republic of China as the sole representative of China, while the Taiwan-relocated Republic of China was hostile to all communist factors.

Modern relations
Since the end of communism in 1989, Poland and Taiwan had started embracing a stronger and advocating tie. Being allies of the United States and have enjoyed a large decree of success with democratic ideals, the two nations seek to tie stronger.

Several economic agreements have been signed between two nations, notably the double taxation agreement and recently solar energy agreement.

During the COVID-19 pandemic Poland receives 500,000 masks from Taiwan in gesture of solidarity.

On 28 January 2021, Taiwan and Poland signed a comprehensive criminal justice cooperation agreement including provisions for fighting against transnational crime, increased judicial cooperation, and human rights and rule of law protections. This was the first such agreement signed between Taiwan and a European country.

In early September 2021, Poland donated 400,000 doses of COVID-19 vaccine to Taiwan as a "gesture of solidarity".

See also

 China–Poland relations
 Foreign relations of Poland

References

Taiwan
Bilateral relations of Taiwan